The Coventry North West by-election, in Coventry on 4 March 1976, was held after the death of Labour Member of Parliament (MP) Maurice Edelman. A safe Labour seat, it was won by Geoffrey Robinson, who retained the seat until 2019.

Party performance
The by-election represented the first outing for the National Party; it had recently split from the National Front and both parties ran candidates in the election. Although both polled poorly, it set a trend for a split far right vote which was replicated in the 1989 Vauxhall by-election and elsewhere.

The Liberal Party vote fell in this by-election, a development that former leader Jo Grimond blamed in part on scandals surrounding incumbent Jeremy Thorpe's homosexuality. Grimond suggested that the result and the allegations meant that Thorpe "must think of stepping down". Thorpe stood down as Liberal leader two months later.

Results

References

Coventry North West by-election
By-elections to the Parliament of the United Kingdom in West Midlands (county) constituencies
Coventry North West by-election
Elections in Coventry
20th century in Coventry
Coventry North West by-election
Birmingham